Pavel Aleksandrovich Ivashko (born 16 November 1994 in Surgut) is a Russian sprinter specialising in the 400 metres. He won the silver with the Russian 4 × 400 metres relay at the 2014 European Championships. Individually his biggest success is the silver medal at the 2015 European U23 Championships.

His personal best in the event is 45.25 seconds set in the heats of the 2015 World Championships in Beijing.

Competition record

References

1994 births
Living people
Sportspeople from Surgut
Russian male sprinters
World Athletics Championships athletes for Russia
European Athletics Championships medalists
Russian Athletics Championships winners
21st-century Russian people